The Mehmet Çakır Cultural and Sports Center is a cultural and sports  complex located in Çengelköy neighborhood of Üsküdar district in Istanbul, Turkey. It is named after Mehmet Çakır, the former mayor of Üsküdar district.

Inaugurated officially on May 26, 2015, the center has three indoor swimming pool halls for males and three for females, including two semi-olympic swimming pools of size  with 200-spectator capacity each. The complex has a parking lot capable of 400 vehicles in total, including a covered obe for 300 vehicles. It is the biggest sports venue on the Anatolian part of Istanbul.

The complex was closed for use due to leaking water from the pool beds down to the basement as reported in October 2015.

References

Sports venues in Istanbul
Swimming venues in Turkey
Sports venues completed in 2015
Üsküdar
2015 establishments in Turkey